Newport Guildhall is a municipal structure in the High Street in Newport, Isle of Wight, England. The guildhall, which was the headquarters of Newport Borough Council, is a Grade II* listed building.

History

The first municipal building in Newport was a 17th town hall located between Watchbell Lane and Holyrood Street; it was arcaded on the ground floor, so that markets could be held, with an assembly room on the first floor. In the early 19th century civic leaders decided to procure a new building on a site just to the east of the original building.

The new building was designed by John Nash in the neoclassical style, rendered with stucco and completed in 1819. The design involved a symmetrical main frontage with three bays facing onto Quay Street; the design of the building, which was arcaded on the ground floor, involved a tetrastyle portico with Ionic order columns on the first floor supporting an entablature and a dentilled pediment. There were sash windows on the first floor, which was recessed with iron railings at the front. A clock tower with a cupola was erected in 1887–8 in the southwest corner of the building to celebrate Golden Jubilee of Queen Victoria in 1887.

The building continued to serve as the headquarters of Newport Borough Council until 1967, when it was converted to the island's main law courts. Newport Council and its successor Medina Borough Council, were subsequently based at the former town clerk's office at 17 Quay Street in Newport, but, by the mid-1980s, civic leaders increasingly operated from the more substantial facilities at Northwood House in Cowes. After the construction of Newport Law Courts in Quay Street in 1994, the building was no longer required as a judiciary facility; instead, it was a converted for use a tourist information office and the Museum of Island History was established in the building in 1996. The museum's collection was formed from archaeological material previously held by the Carisbrooke Castle Museum, but, since then, it has inherited or purchased other collections covering all aspects of the island's history from its geological origins to the present day.

Works of art in the guildhall include a portrait of the Italian political leader, Giuseppe Garibaldi, who visited Brook House, the home of the politician, Charles Seely, in 1864.

See also
 Grade II* listed buildings on the Isle of Wight

References

Government buildings completed in 1819
City and town halls on the Isle of Wight
Newport, Isle of Wight
Grade II* listed buildings on the Isle of Wight